Geng Kui, born in Xianyang, Shaanxi, was a general sent by Dou Xian to defeat the unnamed Northern Chanyu, leader of the Xiongnu nomads. He achieved this in 91 AD, shortly after the Battle of Ikh Bayan. The Northern Chanyu was defeated once more and fled away, abandoning his kingdom. It is unknown where he went or what became of him.

In 109 the Southern Chanyu with a number of Wuhuan and Xianbi rebelled and, by winter, controlled a large area of the northern commanderies near the Yellow River. 20,000 men under He Xi were sent to aid the local Chinese forces. Geng Kui, who is named as being the Governor of Liaodong at the time, and Liang Qin, the last Protector General of the Western Regions who was hurriedly sent with 8,000 men bore the brunt of the fighting. In the 3rd month of 110 the Southern Chanyu was overwhelmed and came to kowtow and begged to surrender. His request was granted.

In the summer of 121, the Xianbi along with the Mo and Hui peoples of the northeast defeated and killed the Grand Administrator Cai Feng. In the autumn they defeated the troops of Yunzhong Commandery and killed Grand Administrator Cheng Yan, and besieged the Colonel Protector of the Wuhuan in the city of Macheng. Geng Kui, who was now entitled the new General Who Crosses the Liao, managed with a large army to drive off, but not defeat the Xianbi and relieve the siege of Macheng. However, the Xianbi, from this time on became more aggressive regularly raiding along the frontier with a force said to number tens of thousands of mounted archers.  

About the time Chanyu Tan died in 124, Geng Kui left office.

Footnotes

References
Chavannes, Édouard (1906): "Trois Généraux Chinois de la dynastie des Han Orientaux. Pan Tch’ao (32-102 p.C.); – son fils Pan Yong; – Leang K’in (112 p.C.). Chapitre LXXVII du Heou Han chou." Chavannes. T’oung pao 7, pp. 210–269.
de Crespigny, Rafe (1984) Northern Frontier. The Policies and Strategies of the Later Han Empire. Faculty of Asian Studies, Australian National University. Canberra.
Hill, John E. (2009) Through the Jade Gate to Rome: A Study of the Silk Routes during the Later Han Dynasty, 1st to 2nd Centuries CE. BookSurge, Charleston, South Carolina. .

Han dynasty generals